The Hopatcong Public Schools are a comprehensive community public school district that serves students in pre-kindergarten through twelfth grade from Hopatcong, in Sussex County, New Jersey, United States.

As of the 2020–21 school year, the district, comprised of four schools, had an enrollment of 1,449 students and 146.1 classroom teachers (on an FTE basis), for a student–teacher ratio of 9.9:1.

To address a significant reduction in state aid, Hudson Maxim School, which had served grades PreK-1, was closed at the end of the 2018-19 school year. For the 2019-20 school year, the grades were reconfigured across the remaining four school facilities.

The district is classified by the New Jersey Department of Education as being in District Factor Group "FG", the fourth-highest of eight groupings. District Factor Groups organize districts statewide to allow comparison by common socioeconomic characteristics of the local districts. From lowest socioeconomic status to highest, the categories are A, B, CD, DE, FG, GH, I and J.

Schools
Schools in the district (with 2020–21 enrollment data from the National Center for Education Statistics) are:
Elementary schools
Tulsa Trail Elementary School with 249 students in grades PreK-1
Brian Byrne, Principal
Durban Avenue School with 227 students in grades 2-3
Katherine McFadden, Principal
Middle school
Hopatcong Middle School with 459 students in grades 4-7
Lewis Benfatti, Principal
High school
Hopatcong High School with 499 students in grades 8-12
Stephanie Martinez, Principal

Administration
Core members of the district's administration are:
Dr. Joseph S. Piccirillo, Superintendent of Schools
Jeff Hallenbeck, Business Administrator / Board Secretary

Board of education
The district's board of education, comprised of nine members, sets policy and oversees the fiscal and educational operation of the district through its administration. As a Type II school district, the board's trustees are elected directly by voters to serve three-year terms of office on a staggered basis, with three seats up for election each year held (since 2012) as part of the November general election. The board appoints a superintendent to oversee the district's day-to-day operations and a business administrator to supervise the business functions of the district.

References

External links
Hopatcong Public Schools

Data for Hopatcong Public Schools, National Center for Education Statistics

Hopatcong, New Jersey
New Jersey District Factor Group FG
School districts in Sussex County, New Jersey